H. fragilis may refer to:
 Halimeda fragilis, a green macroalga species
 Hechtia fragilis, a plant species endemic to Mexico

Synonyms
 Humboldtia fragilis, a synonym for Acianthera luteola, an orchid species

See also
 Fragilis (disambiguation)